Monster of the Andes may refer to:

 Daniel Barbosa a mass murderer (also known as "Beast Of The Andes")
 Pedro López a reputed mass murderer